McCracken is a hereditary surname derived from Ulster and nearby Galloway, Scotland. It is an Anglicisation of Mac Reachtain an Ulster Gaelic variant of the patronymic surname Mac Neachtain (commonly Anglicised as McNaughton).

People surnamed McCracken
 Annie Virginia McCracken (1686–?), American author
 Bert McCracken (born 1982), American vocalist
 Billy McCracken (1883–1979), Northern Ireland football player
 Bob McCracken (1904-1972), American jazz clarinetist
 Branch McCracken (1908–1970), American basketball coach
 Brian McCracken (born 1934), Irish jurist and Justice of the Irish Supreme Court
 Craig McCracken (born 1971), American animator
 Daniel D. McCracken (1930–2011) American computer scientist
 David McCracken (born 1981) Scottish football player
 Eileen McCracken (1920–1988), Irish botanist
 Edward R. McCracken American businessman
 Elizabeth McCracken (born 1966), American author
 Esther McCracken (1902–1971), British actress and playwright
 Frederick McCracken (1859-1949), British general
 Harold McCracken (1894–1983), American author
 Harry McCracken (born 1964), American journalist, editor in chief of PC World
 Harry McCracken (footballer), Northern Irish footballer
 Henry Joy McCracken (1767–1798), Irish rebel
 Henry Noble McCracken (1880-1970), American chancellor of New York University
 Herb McCracken (1899–1995), American football coach
 Hugh McCracken (1942–2013), American musician
 J. J. McCracken (born 1972), American artist
 Jack McCracken (1911–1958), American basketball player
 Jack McCracken (Scouting)
 James McCracken (1926–1988), American tenor
 Janet McCracken, American academic
 Jarrod McCracken, New Zealand rugby league player
 Jeff McCracken (born 1952), American actor, director, and producer
 Jeremy McCracken, British television director
 Joan McCracken (1917–1961), American actress and dancer
 John McCracken (artist) (1934-2011), American artist
 Josephine Clifford McCracken (1839–1921), German-born American
 Josiah McCracken (1874–1952), US college football All American and Olympic medal winner
 Krista McCracken, Canadian public historian and archivist
 Mark McCracken (born 1960), American actor
 Mary Ann McCracken (1770–1866), Irish radical and anti-slavery campaigner
 Mary Isabel McCracken (1866–1955), American entomologist 
 Paul McCracken (basketball) (born 1950), NBA and Maccabi Tel Aviv basketball player
 Paul McCracken (economist) (born 1915), American economist and former chairman of the President's Council of Economic Advisers
 Philip McCracken (born 1928), American artist
 Peter Hale McCracken, American founder of Serials Solutions
 Quinton McCracken (born 1970), American major league baseball player
 Robert McCracken (footballer) (1890–unknown), Northern Irish professional footballer
 Robert McCracken (born 1968), United Kingdom professional boxer
 Robert M. McCracken (1874–1934), American politician
 Sandra McCracken (born 1977), American musician
 Thomas McCracken Jr. (born 1952), American lawyer and politician
 Voros McCracken (born 1971), American sabermetrician
 William McCracken (c. 1864 – 1940), American football coach and college educator

Notes

Surnames of Irish origin
Scottish surnames